Green pepper can refer to:

Green examples of fruits of the species Capsicum annuum, called a bell pepper in North America, simply a pepper in the United Kingdom and Ireland, and a capsicum in India, Australia, and New Zealand
Chili pepper, a hot pepper, some of which are green
Zanthoxylum armatum, rattan pepper
Dried or pickled unripe fruit of Piper nigrum